Francisco Sánchez Parra (born 30 June 1979 in Mallorca) is a male freestyle wrestler from Spain. He participated in the Men's Freestyle (– 55 kg) at 2008 Summer Olympics losing in 1/8 of final to Kim Hyo-Sub.

References
 Wrestler bio on beijing2008.com

Living people
1979 births
Olympic wrestlers of Spain
Wrestlers at the 2008 Summer Olympics
Spanish male sport wrestlers

Mediterranean Games gold medalists for Spain
Competitors at the 2005 Mediterranean Games
Mediterranean Games medalists in wrestling
21st-century Spanish people